Jamrag, also rendered as Jamrak, may refer to:
Jamrag-e Shomali (North Jamrag)

See also
 Some Time in New York City, an album containing a song "Jamrag"